The Artistry of Glen Campbell is a double album from 1972 which was originally sold through the Glen Campbell Fan Club. The songs are made up of B-sides, previously unreleased material and new recordings of mainly public domain songs. The B-sides are taken from the following singles: "Dreams of the Everyday Housewife"/"Kelli Hoe Down" (1968),
"True Grit"/"Hava Nagila" (1969), *"By the Time I Get to Phoenix-I Say a Little Prayer" (duet with Anne Murray)/"All through the Night" (1971) and "Manhattan Kansas"/"Wayfaring Stranger" (1972). The second album contains instrumental songs only.

Track listing
Glen Sings

Side 1:

 "Aura Lee" - 2:54
 "Wayfaring Stranger" - 2:21
 "Shenandoah" - 2:50
 "Scarlet Ribbons" - 3:10
 "Danny Boy" - 2:28

Side 2:

 "Foggy, Foggy Dew" - 3:25
 "Barbara Allen" - 2:42
 "Rovin' Gambler" - 3:00
 "All Through the Night" - 2:14
 "Greensleeves" - 3:07

Glen Plays

Side 3:

 "Hava Nagila" - 2:14
 "Banjo Garden" - 1:58
 "Wild Flower" - 2:00
 "Brass Tracks" - 2:01
 "Kelli Hoe Down" (Glen Campbell) - 1:46

Side 4:

 "Love Is Blue" - 1:50
 "Raunchy" - 2:40
 "Classical Gas" (Mason Williams) - 3:03
 "Bach Talk" - 2:04
 "Tequila" - 2:40

1972 compilation albums
Glen Campbell compilation albums
Capitol Records compilation albums
Albums recorded at Capitol Studios